William Robert Wellesley Peel, 1st Earl Peel,  (7 January 1867 – 28 September 1937), known as Viscount Peel from 1912 to 1929, was a British politician who was a local councillor, a Member of Parliament and a member of the House of Lords. After an early career as a barrister and a journalist, he entered first local and then national politics.  He rose to hold a number of ministerial positions but is probably best remembered for chairing the Peel Commission in 1936–1937, which recommended for the first time the partition of the British Mandate of Palestine into separate Jewish and Arab states.

The grandson of a Conservative prime minister, he was unusual even for his period in the number of political parties for which he was elected. He began as a member and later became the leader of the London locally-organised Municipal Reform Party and was later elected as an MP for the Liberal Unionists and then for the Conservative Party before he inherited his seat in the Lords in 1912. He also served as a minister in governments led by Liberal, Conservative and Labour prime ministers.

His ministerial career began as Under-Secretary of State for War in 1919, and he entered the cabinet in 1922 as Secretary of State for India and held a number of other ministerial positions.

Early life and career
The eldest son of Arthur Peel, 1st Viscount Peel, and Adelaide Dugdale, William Peel was born in London in 1867. His father was the fifth and youngest son of Prime Minister Sir Robert Peel.

Peel was educated at Harrow and Balliol College, Oxford, where he was secretary of the Oxford Union.

In 1893, he was called to the bar at the Inner Temple and practised as a barrister before taking the position of special correspondent for the Daily Telegraph during the Greco-Turkish War of 1897.

Political career
In 1900, Peel was appointed a member of the Royal Commission that was formed to inquire into the operation of the Port of London. In February the same year, he began his political career when he was elected in a by-election to fill a vacant seat for Woolwich in the London County Council to which he was re-elected in the ordinary election the following year. He was a member of the pro-Conservative grouping on the council that became the Municipal Reform Party. He was leader of the party from 1908 to 1910 and chairman of the county council from 1914 to 1916.

He began his parliamentary career when he was elected as Liberal Unionist MP for Manchester South at the 1900 Manchester South by-election. At the next general election in 1906, he stood unsuccessfully at Harrow. He returned to the Commons in 1909, when he was elected as Conservative MP for Taunton at a by-election. He inherited his father's viscountcy in 1912 and so moved to the House of Lords.

Peel was appointed a deputy lieutenant of Bedfordshire and lieutenant-colonel of the Bedfordshire Yeomanry in 1912 and, at the outbreak of the First World War moved to France with his regiment, but ill health made him return to Britain in 1915. In 1918, he received his first government post as Joint Parliamentary Secretary at the Department of National Service in the coalition government of David Lloyd George. In 1919, Peel became Under-Secretary of State for War and a member of the Privy Council. Two years later, he became Chancellor of the Duchy of Lancaster and Minister for Transport.

He entered the cabinet in 1922 as Secretary of State for India, and, after the downfall of Lloyd George's coalition, continued to hold the post during the premierships of Andrew Bonar Law and Stanley Baldwin. The latter's government fell in January 1924, but after a brief spell in opposition, it was returned to power at the 1924 general election. Peel was appointed First Commissioner of Works in the Conservative administration formed by Baldwin. In 1928, Peel briefly returned to the India Office, but the Conservatives lost power by the 1929 general election.

In 1929, Peel was created Viscount Clanfield, of Clanfield in the County of Southampton, and Earl Peel in that year's Dissolution Honours. When a Conservative-dominated National Government was formed after the 1931 election, he became Lord Privy Seal but held that office for only two months and left government in November.

In 1932, he was appointed chairman of the Wheat Commission, and in 1934, he chaired the Royal Commission on the Common Law. In 1936–1937, he chaired the Peel Commission, which recommended for the first time the partition of the British Mandate of Palestine into separate Jewish and Arab states.

Family
Peel married the Honourable Eleanor, daughter of James Williamson, 1st Baron Ashton, in 1899. They had two children: Arthur Peel, 2nd Earl Peel and Lady Doris, who married Colonel Stewart Blacker.

In 1929, Ashton died, and Peel succeeded him as chairman of James Williamson and Company. He was a director of Barclays Bank and of the Great Northern Railway.

Death
Lord Peel died at 70 in his home in East Meon, near Petersfield, Hampshire, in 1937 after a long illness. He was succeeded in his titles by his son, Arthur.

References

External links

Peel, William Wellesley, 1st Earl
Peel, William Wellesley, 1st Earl
People educated at Harrow School
Military personnel from London
British Army personnel of World War I
Alumni of Balliol College, Oxford
Peel, William Peel, 1st Earl
Peel, William Wellesley, 1st Earl
Peel, William Wellesley, 1st Earl
Peel, William Wellesley, 1st Earl
Peel, William Wellesley, 1st Earl
Wellesley, William
Liberal Unionist Party MPs for English constituencies
UK MPs 1900–1906
UK MPs 1906–1910
UK MPs 1910
UK MPs 1910–1918
UK MPs who were granted peerages
UK MPs who inherited peerages
Deputy Lieutenants of Bedfordshire
William
People of the 1936–1939 Arab revolt in Palestine
Bedfordshire Yeomanry officers
Conservative Party (UK) MPs for English constituencies
Members of the Parliament of the United Kingdom for Taunton
Secretaries of State for Transport (UK)
People from East Meon
Peers created by George V
Chancellors of the Duchy of Lancaster
Viscounts Peel